Clerkenwell Bridewell was a prison and correctional institute for prostitutes and vagrants located in the Clerkenwell area, immediately north of the City of London (in the modern London Borough of Islington), between c. 1615 and 1794, when it was superseded by the nearby Coldbath Fields Prison in Mount Pleasant. It was named 'Bridewell' after the Bridewell Palace, which during the 16th century had become one of the City of London's most important prisons.

Next door was another prison, the New Prison (1617–1877). The Clerkenwell House of Detention, also known simply as Clerkenwell Prison, was built on the site of the two former prisons. Today, the site is occupied by the former Hugh Myddleton School (1893 – c. 1960), in Bowling Green Lane, which has now been converted into flats. The Victorian vaults of the House of Detention can still be accessed from Clerkenwell Close.

Notable inmates
John Robins (prophet) (fl. 1650–1652), released after signing a recantation against his former blasphemy.

References

1615 establishments in England
1794 disestablishments in England
Defunct prisons in London
Former buildings and structures in the London Borough of Islington
Bridewell
17th century in London
18th century in London
Demolished prisons